Alcterogystia l-nigra is a moth in the family Cossidae. It is found in Egypt, Yemen, Saudi Arabia and Oman.

References

Natural History Museum Lepidoptera generic names catalog

Cossinae
Moths described in 1894
Moths of Africa
Moths of the Middle East